Anthony McCracken (born 11 January 1983, Sydney, Australia) is a retired Australian professional boxer.

The biggest win in McCracken's career was against David Aloua in their second fight in November 2014, to win the WBA Pan African, WBC – OPBF and WBO Asia Pacific Cruiserweight title. With this McCraken received a top 15 ranking in WBA, WBO and top 40 in WBC and IBO. Aloua defeated McCracken in April 2012 in their first fight. There was a contract clause where if McCracken won the bout, the two must fight again for a trilogy, however the fight did not end up happening as boxing boxers retired.

McCracken has been offered a world title fight in the past, however he turned it down due to himself not feeling ready and instead went to fought in New Zealand against in March 2015. McCracken as not fought since his three title defense in New Zealand against Samoan Vaitele Soi.

Professional boxing titles
Australian New South Wales State
Australian New South Wales State cruiserweight title (188½ Ibs)
World Boxing Foundation 
WBF Asia Pacific cruiserweight title (199 Ibs)
World Boxing Council  
Oriental and Pacific Boxing Federation cruiserweight title (196½ Ibs)
World Boxing Association 
WBA Pan African cruiserweight title (196½ Ibs)
World Boxing Organisation
WBO Asia Pacific cruiserweight title (196½ Ibs)

Professional boxing record

References

1983 births
Living people
Cruiserweight boxers
Australian male boxers
Boxers from Sydney